The Medical Council of New Zealand is the peak national standards and assessment body for medical education and training. It is responsible for the registration of doctors and has the power to suspend or remove the right to practise medicine in New Zealand. Its responsibilities are defined by the Health Practitioners Competence Assurance Act 2003 and it is funded by practitioner fees paid by all practising doctors in New Zealand.

See also
Health care in New Zealand
Cartwright Inquiry

External links

Medical education in New Zealand
Medical associations based in New Zealand